Brian Dold (19 August 1930 – 14 September 1976) was a South African cricketer. He played in fourteen first-class matches for Eastern Province in 1970/71.

See also
 List of Eastern Province representative cricketers

References

External links
 

1930 births
1976 deaths
South African cricketers
Eastern Province cricketers
People from Makhanda, Eastern Cape
Cricketers from the Eastern Cape